Dante Campbell (born May 22, 1999) is a Canadian professional soccer player who plays as a midfielder for Valour FC in the Canadian Premier League.

Early life
Campbell began playing youth soccer with Brampton East SC at age seven. When he was 13, he joined the Toronto FC Academy.

Club career
From 2016 to 2018, Campbell played with Toronto FC III in the Premier Development League and League1 Ontario.

On July 31, 2016, Campbell made his professional debut with Toronto FC II in the USL, as an academy call-up, against Bethlehem Steel FC, in a substitute appearance. In July 2017, he signed a full professional contract with Toronto FC II. In April 2019, he signed a two-year extension with the team. In August 2020, after TFC2 opted out of the 2020 season, due to travel restrictions caused by the COVID-19 pandemic, Campbell was loaned to Valour FC of the Canadian Premier League. He made five appearances for Valour in the shortened 2020 season, before returning to Toronto FC II. In April 2021, he extended his contract for another season.

In March 2022, Campbell joined USL Championship side LA Galaxy II. He scored his first goal on April 23, 2022 against the Las Vegas Lights.

In February 2023, he returned to Valour FC on a permanent contract.

International career
Campbell made his debut in the Canadian national program in November 2013, attending a Canada U15 youth camp. He was named to the Canadian U17 team for the 2015 CONCACAF U-17 Championship. Campbell was named to the Canadian Under-20 squad for the 2017 CONCACAF U-20 Championship and 2018 CONCACAF U-20 Championship.

Career statistics

References

External links
 
 

1999 births
Living people
Association football midfielders
Canadian soccer players
Soccer players from Toronto
Sportspeople from Etobicoke
Canadian people of Jamaican descent
Black Canadian soccer players
Toronto FC players
Toronto FC II players
Valour FC players
LA Galaxy II players
League1 Ontario players
USL Championship players
USL League One players
USL League Two players
Canadian Premier League players
Canada men's youth international soccer players